Koichi Wada (born 25 July 1916, date of death unknown) was a Japanese water polo player. He competed in the men's tournament at the 1936 Summer Olympics.

References

External links

1916 births
Year of death missing
Japanese male water polo players
Olympic water polo players of Japan
Water polo players at the 1936 Summer Olympics
Place of birth missing